Scrobipalpa meteorica is a moth in the family Gelechiidae. It was described by Povolný in 1984. It is found in Asia Minor.

The hindwings are light grey with darker grey around the edges.

References

Scrobipalpa
Moths described in 1984